Association of Vermont Independent Colleges (AVIC) is a membership industry organization for independent Vermont higher education institutions.  It was founded in 1981 and is located in Montpelier, the state capital. AVIC services school administrators and leaders of 19 private institutions, whose cooperative endeavors benefit member institutions as well as students and their families. AVIC is a member of the National Association of Independent Colleges and Universities.

The organization's mission is to broadly inform both decision-makers and the public about the role that independent colleges and universities can play in the future of Vermont and the nation, shape public policy, and support the work of campus leaders, specifically through:
 Strengthening the quality of higher education in Vermont
 Increasing accessibility to the broadest range of students
 Fostering cooperative efforts among its member institutions and all segments of higher education
 Expanding the capacity of Vermont’s independent educational network 
 Attracting students who will contribute to the state’s future workforce as well as the economic, civic, and cultural life of Vermont
 Ensuring that students have the information and resources they need to attend college
 Helping attract those who will contribute to the state’s future workforce

The membership together enrolls 18,000 students, and issues fifty-one percent of college degrees in Vermont. AVIC members include Bennington College, Burlington College, Champlain College, College of St. Joseph, Goddard College, Green Mountain College, Landmark College, Marlboro College, Middlebury College, New England Culinary Institute, Norwich University, Saint Michael's College, SIT Graduate Institute, Southern Vermont College, Sterling College, Vermont College of Fine Arts, Vermont Law School, and Associate Members, Albany College of Pharmacy and Health Science, and Union Institute and University.

The organizational structure is a not-for-profit with a board, executive, and administrative staff. The current President is Susan Stitely.

References 

https://web.archive.org/web/20101006021615/http://education.vermont.gov/new/html/directories/postsecondary.html

https://web.archive.org/web/20131114072549/http://www.naicu.edu/member_center/naicuse.asp

External links 
 

 
1981 establishments in Vermont